Ashbolt is a surname. Notable people with the surname include:

Allan Ashbolt (1921–2005), Australian journalist, producer, and broadcaster
Frank Ashbolt (1876–1940), New Zealand cricketer